Chelicorophium is a genus of amphipod crustaceans, comprising the following species:
Chelicorophium chelicorne (G. O. Sars, 1895)
Chelicorophium curvispinum (G. O. Sars, 1895)
Chelicorophium madrasensis (Nayar, 1950)
Chelicorophium maeoticum (Sowinsky, 1898)
Chelicorophium monodon (G. O. Sars, 1895)
Chelicorophium muconatum (G. O. Sars, 1895)
Chelicorophium nobile (G. O. Sars, 1895)
Chelicorophium robustum (G. O. Sars, 1895)
Chelicorophium sowinsky (Martynov, 1924)
Chelicorophium spinulosum (G. O. Sars, 1895)
Chelicorophium spongicolum (Welitchkovsky, 1914)
Chelicorophium villosus (Carausu, 1943)

References

Corophiidea